Michael Regan (born September 10, 1961) is an American politician and former U.S. Marshal. A Republican, he is the Pennsylvania State Senator from the 31st district. Prior to that, he served as a member of the Pennsylvania House of Representatives, representing the 92nd district from 2013 to 2016.

Early life and law enforcement career
Regan graduated from Cedar Cliff High School and received a bachelor's degree in criminal justice from Albright College. He began a career in law enforcement, serving as a US Marshal in Miami before returning to fill this same role in South Central Pennsylvania in 1990. In 2002, Regan was appointed as the U.S. Marshal for the United States District Court for the Middle District of Pennsylvania, which required a nomination by President George W. Bush and a confirmation by the United States Senate. In 2011, Regan retired from federal service and was appointed as Deputy Inspector General of Pennsylvania by Governor Tom Corbett.

Pennsylvania House of Representatives
In 2012, Regan was elected to serve the 92nd District in the Pennsylvania House of Representatives. Regan won the Republican primary election with 35.6% of the vote among five candidates. He then defeated a Democrat in the general election with 71.7% of the vote.

In 2014, Regan won reelection to his House seat, running unopposed in both the primary and general elections.

Pennsylvania State Senate

2016 campaign 
In August 2015, Regan announced that he was running for District 31 of the Pennsylvania Senate. In the Republican primary election, Regan faced dentist Brice Arndt, former NFL player Jon Ritchie, and attorney Scott Harper. Regan won the primary election with 52% of the vote. Many political pundits called the primary campaign one of the most competitive Republican primaries in recent history.

Regan was officially elected to the Pennsylvania Senate in November 2016, defeating Democrat John Bosha with 65% of the vote.

Tenure

Regan was sworn in as the Senator for Pennsylvania's 31st Senatorial District in January 2017.

Senator Regan currently serves as Chairman of the Veterans Affairs & Emergency Preparedness Committee and Vice Chairman of the Local Government Committee. He is also a member of the Consumer Protection & Professional Licensure Committee, Judiciary Committee, Law & Justice Committee, and the Rules & Executive Nominations Committee.

Committee assignments 

 Law & Justice, Chair
 Local Government, Vice Chair
 Community, Economic & Recreational Development
 Consumer Protection & Professional Licensure
 Judiciary
 Rules & Executive Nominations

References

External links
State Senator-elect Mike Regan
Mike Regan for State Senate

1961 births
Living people
Republican Party Pennsylvania state senators
Republican Party members of the Pennsylvania House of Representatives
Albright College alumni
United States Marshals
21st-century American politicians